Eugenie de Sade (original titles: Eugénie and Eugenie Sex Happening) is a softcore film adaptation and modern-day update of the Marquis de Sade's short story "Eugénie de Franval" (1800) directed by Spanish filmmaker Jesús Franco in 1970 and released in 1973. It has often been confused with his earlier Eugenie… The Story of Her Journey into Perversion (1970), an adaptation of de Sade's book Philosophy in the Bedroom (1795), as both films are often referred to simply as Eugenie.

Cast
 Soledad Miranda as Eugénie Radeck de Franval
 Paul Muller as Albert Radeck de Franval
 Andrea Montchal as Paul
 Greta Schmidt as Kitty
 Alice Arno as photo model

Further reading
 Stephen Thrower. Murderous Passions: The Delirious Cinema of Jesús Franco: 1. Strange Attractor Press. 2015.

See also
 Marquis de Sade in popular culture

Notes

External links
 
View full film

1973 films
BDSM in films
Films based on works by the Marquis de Sade
Films about the Marquis de Sade
Films directed by Jesús Franco
1970s erotic thriller films
Incest in film